Over Again may refer to:

"Over Again", a song by Cavo from Bright Nights Dark Days, 2009
"Over Again", a song by Mike Shinoda from Post Traumatic, 2018
"Over Again", a song by New Found Glory from Radiosurgery, 2011
"Over Again", a song by One Direction from Take Me Home, 2012
"Over Again", a song by Aya Kamiki and Takuya, 2021

See also
"Over and Over Again", a song by Nathan Sykes
Over and Over Again (disambiguation)